Egypt has many fossil-bearing geologic formations, in which many dinosaurs have been discovered.

Scientists
Ernst Stromer
Richard Markgraf, early 1900s, (he died in Sinnuris of Giza in 1916)
 A. B. Orlebar, Fayoum 1845
 George Schweinfurth, Geziret al-Qarn in Lake Qarun 1879 & Qasr al-Sagha Formation ancient whale fossils named Zeuglodom osiris.
 Hugh Beadnell, Fayoum 1898
 Charles Andrews, 1901, they unearthed a wealth of fossils Palaeomastodon, the oldest known elephant
 Eberhard Frass, Fayoum 1905
 Walter Granger & Henry F. Osborn, Fayoum 1907
 Wendell Phillips, 1947
 Elwyn L. Simons, Fayoum 1961–1986
 Thomas M. Bown and David Tab Rasmussen, 1980s

Fossils

Petrified Wood

Fayoum, Petrified wood protectorate in New-Cairo Area/ Cairo-Suez desert road & entire Western Desert of Egypt is covered in Petrified wood.

This is one of the clues that the region was a tropical climate. The petrified wood is very diverse and many samples are very beautiful, often actually littering the ground in certain areas.

Reptiles
 Turtle fossils in Fayoum
Testudo ammon, a large land tortoise
Podocnemis blanckenhorni river turtle
Stereogenys pelomedusa tropical land turtles
 Gigantic snake fossils found in the Qasr al-Sagha Formation.
Gigantophis
Pterosphernus
 Tomistoma, a crocodile type animal.

Birds
The area of Uganda bordering Lake Victoria and the upper Nile River area is not unlike the climate of the Fayoum long ago, where many bird fossils have been discovered.
 ospreys (Pandionidae)
 Gigantic shoebilled stork (Balaenicipitidae)
 jacanas, sometimes called lily-trotters (Jacanidae)
 herons, egrets, rails (Rallidae)
 cranes (Gruidae)
 flamingos (Phoenicopteridae)
 storks (Ciconiidae)
 cormorants (Phalacrocoracidae)
 An ancient eagle named Accipitridae

Mammals
 large Hyrax (Megalohyrax oecaenus)
 Elephants
 mastodons
 Fayoum's whale or Zeuglodon or more precisely the Basilosaurus in Fayoum's Wadi Zeuglodon (or wadi al-Hitan, Whale Valley)
 Another whale in Wadi Zeuglodon is the Dorudon
Primitive whale from Fayum Depression Phiomicetus
 Arsinoitherium, a rhinoceros like animal with two horns
 Arsinoitherium zitteli
 Arsinoitherium andrewsi
 Elephants (mastodons) in Fayoum
 Moeritherium in Fayoum, and in Wadi El Natrun
 Palaeomastodon
 Phioma
 Apterodon
 Pterodon
 Hyaenodon
 Sirenia (Sea Cow)

Primates
The Fayoum primates 
 The Lower sequence primates
 Oligopithecus savagei
 Qatrania wingi
 The upper sequence primates
 Catopithecus browni
 Proteopitheus sylvia
 Oligopithecus
 Apidium moustafai
 Apidium phiomense
 Parapithecus fraasi
 Parapithecus grangeri
 Aegyptopithecus zeuxis
 Propliopithecus, (P. chirobates, P. ankeli, P. haeckeli and P. markgrafi)

Dinosaurs
Aegyptosaurus
Bahariasaurus
Carcharodontosaurus
Deltadromeus
 ‘’Inosaurus’’
Mansourasaurus
Paralititan
Spinosaurus

Fossil sites
 Wadi Al-Hitan
Bahariya Formation
Jebel Qatrani Formation
Nubian Sandstone
Qasr el Sagha Formation
Upper Cretaceous Phosphates
Variegated Shale
Madwar al-Bighal
Moghra Oasis

See also
List of African dinosaurs

External links
 

 
Biota of Egypt